Sándor Bereczky (born 10 March 1965) is a Hungarian sports shooter. He competed in two events at the 1988 Summer Olympics.

References

1965 births
Living people
Hungarian male sport shooters
Olympic shooters of Hungary
Shooters at the 1988 Summer Olympics
Sportspeople from Debrecen